Tumbler may refer to:

 Tumbler (firearms), a part of the firing mechanism in older firearms
 Tumbler (glass), a type of glassware      
 Tumbler (pigeon), a pigeon breed 
 Tumbler (Project Xanadu), a unique identifier of a unit of text or an embedded link
 Tumbler toy or roly-poly toy, a type of toy that can tumble over and then straighten up by itself
 Tumbler, a machine for tumble polishing solid material
 Tumbler, a participant in tumbling    
 Tumbler, part of a lock
 Tumbler, an obsolete name for a porpoise
 Compost tumbler, a tumbler for composting
 Cryptocurrency tumbler, a service to mix and anonymize cryptocurrency
 The Tumbler (Batmobile), a prototype military vehicle used by Batman in The Dark Knight Trilogy
 The Tumbler, a 1968 album by John Martyn

See also
 Tumble dryer, for drying clothes
 Tumblr, an internet microblogging and social networking platform
 List of tumblers (small Solar System bodies)